Ornatilinea is a bacteria genus from the family of Anaerolineaceae with one known species (Ornatilinea apprima). Ornatilinea apprima has been isolated from microbial mat from an anaerobic sludge blanket reactor from the Tomsk Region in Russia.

References

Chloroflexota
Bacteria genera
Monotypic bacteria genera